Mount Hua or Huashan is a sacred mountain in Shaanxi, China

Huashan may also refer to the following locations in China:

Huashan Rock Art, Guangxi
Huashan District (花山区), Ma'anshan, Anhui
Hua Hill (华不注山), in northeastern Jinan, Shandong

Towns
Written as "华山镇"
Huashan, Shaanxi, where Mount Hua is located, Shaanxi
Huashan, Beijing, in Pinggu District, Beijing
Huashan, Feng County, Jiangsu
Huashan, Jimo City, Shandong
Huashan, Jinan, in Licheng District, Jinan, Shandong

Written as "花山":
Huashan, Guangzhou, in Huadu District, Guangzhou, Guangdong
Huashan, Wuhan, in Hongshan District, Wuhan, Hubei
Huashan, Linjiang, Jilin

Townships
Huashan Township, Bayan County (华山乡), Heilongjiang
Written as "花山乡":
Huashan Township, Ningxiang County, Hunan
Huashan Township, Jingdong County, in Jingdong Yi Autonomous County, Yunnan
Huashan Township, Zhenxiong County, Yunnan

 Huashan, Loudi (花山街道),  a subdistrict of Louxing District, Loudi City, Hunan